The Tampa City Hall is a historic site in Tampa, Florida, United States. It was designed by Bonfoey & Elliott and is located at 315 East John F. Kennedy Boulevard. It was documented by the Historic American Buildings Survey in 1981. On October 1, 1974, it was added to the U.S. National Register of Historic Places. In 2017, the building underwent a $16 million renovation.

Gallery

References

External links
Florida's Office of Cultural and Historical Programs
Hillsborough County listings
Tampa City Hall

City and town halls in Florida
Buildings and structures in Tampa, Florida
National Register of Historic Places in Tampa, Florida
Government of Tampa, Florida
Clock towers in Florida
Government buildings completed in 1915
Historic American Buildings Survey in Florida
1915 establishments in Florida
City and town halls on the National Register of Historic Places in Florida